Robbi, Tobbi und das Fliewatüüt is a popular German book for children by Boy Lornsen, first published in 1967.

It was adapted into a screen play for television as well as into a radio play and two audio dramas. An audio book exists as well.

Plot
The book themes around the adventures of a pupil called Tobias Findteisen (nicknamed Tobbi) who accompanied the robot ROB 344–66/IIIa (nicknamed Robbi) to help with the latter's exam at robot school. The team travels in an all-in-one vehicle, designed by Tobbi and built by Robbi, to find answers to the exam's riddles all over the world.

Tobbi calls this vehicle (which runs on juice from red raspberries, later substituted by cod liver oil) "Flie-wa-tüüt" because:

 it can fly (in German: fliegen)
 it can travel on water (in German Wasser)
 it can be used as a car (and as such has a klaxon making the sound "tüüt")

During their adventures young inventor Tobbi and his pilot Robbi have to tackle many challenges.

Book
The 256-pages sized book was listed in the Auswahlliste des Deutschen Jugendbuchpreises.

Television series

Based on the novel, Robbi, Tobbi und das Fliewatüüt was adapted as a German television series for children by WDR in 1972. It was animated by puppeteer Albrecht Roser and his team.

The series used early chroma key technology. Over the years, the series saw countless re-runs.

Film 

Plays
Known audio drama adaptions:
 WDR radio drama in 1968 with Jürgen von Manger as speaker (Regie: Heinz-Dieter Köhler).
  audio play in 1991 on two CDs or MCs.

See also
List of German television series

References

External links
 

1967 German novels
1967 children's books
German children's novels
German novels adapted into television shows
German children's television series
German television shows featuring puppetry
Television shows based on children's books
Television shows based on German novels
1972 German television series debuts
1972 German television series endings
German-language television shows
Das Erste original programming